Breakfast at Sunrise is a 1927 silent film comedy directed by Malcolm St. Clair and produced by and starring Constance Talmadge. It was distributed by First National Pictures.

Prints survive at George Eastman House and Library of Congress.

Casting
Constance Talmadge as Madeleine
Bryant Washburn as Marquis
Alice White as Loulou
Paulette Duval as Georgiana
Marie Dressler as Queen
Albert Gran as Champignol
Burr McIntosh as General
David Mir - Prince
Don Alvarado as Lussan
Nellie Bly Baker as Madeleine's Maid

See also
At Your Orders, Madame (1939)

References

External links

allmovie/synopsis; Breakfast at Sunrise

1927 films
American silent feature films
Films directed by Malcolm St. Clair
American films based on plays
Silent American comedy films
1927 comedy films
Films produced by Joseph M. Schenck
American black-and-white films
1920s American films